Philippe Joualin (born 25 January 1972) is a French sport shooter who competed in the 2000 Summer Olympics.

References

1972 births
Living people
French male sport shooters
ISSF rifle shooters
Olympic shooters of France
Shooters at the 2000 Summer Olympics